Selo is a Slavic term for a type of village.

It may also refer to:

Slovenia
 Selo, Ajdovščina, a settlement in the Municipality of Ajdovščina, southwestern Slovenia
 Selo, Krško, a settlement in the Municipality of Krško, southeastern Slovenia
 Selo, Moravske Toplice, a settlement in the Municipality of Moravske Toplice, northeastern Slovenia
 Selo, Sežana, a settlement in the Municipality of Sežana, southwestern Slovenia
 Selo, Žiri, a settlement in the Municipality of Žiri, northwestern Slovenia
 Selo, former name of Zgornja Slivnica, a settlement in the Municipality of Grosuplje, southwestern Slovenia
 Selo nad Laškim, a settlement in the Municipality of Laško, eastern Slovenia
 Selo nad Polhovim Gradcem, a settlement in the Municipality of Dobrova–Polhov Gradec, central Slovenia
 Selo pri Bledu, a settlement in the Municipality of Bled, northwestern Slovenia
 Selo pri Ihanu, a settlement in the Municipality of Domžale, central Slovenia
 Selo pri Kostelu, a settlement in the Municipality of Kostel, southern Slovenia
 Selo pri Mirni, a settlement in the Municipality of Mirna, southeastern Slovenia
 Selo pri Moravčah, a settlement in the Municipality of Moravče, northern Slovenia
 Selo pri Pancah, a settlement in the Municipality of Ljubljana, central Slovenia
 Selo pri Radohovi Vasi, a settlement in the Municipality of Ivančna Gorica, southeastern Slovenia
 Selo pri Robu, a settlement in the Municipality of Velike Lašče, southern Slovenia
 Selo pri Vodicah, a settlement in the Municipality of Vodice, central Slovenia
 Selo pri Vranskem, a settlement in the Municipality of Vransko, northeastern Slovenia
 Selo pri Zagorici, a settlement in the Municipality of Mirna Peč, southeastern Slovenia
 Selo pri Žirovnici, a settlement in the Municipality of Žirovnica, northwestern Slovenia

Elsewhere
Selo, Albania, a village in Dropull i Sipërm
Selo, Croatia, a village near Čabar
Selo, Java, a village between Mount Merapi and Mount Merbabu
Selo, Russia, several rural localities in Russia

See also
Sela (disambiguation)
Novo Selo (disambiguation)
Staro Selo (disambiguation)